KTXN-FM (98.7 FM) is an American radio station licensed to serve Victoria, Texas, United States. The station is owned by Broadcast Equities Texas, Inc. and is operated by Townsquare Media.

KTXN-FM broadcasts an adult hits format branded as "Jack FM".

The station was assigned the KTXN-FM call sign by the Federal Communications Commission in 1965.

In September 2008, Broadcast Equities Texas, Inc., reached an agreement to sell this station to GAP Broadcasting through their GAP Broadcasting Victoria License, LLC, subsidiary.  The deal was approved by the FCC on November 25, 2008, and  the transaction is pending consummation.

History
KTXN-FM was initially proposed as a 1 kilowatt Class A facility on channel 221 (92.1 MHz), elevated at 120 meters height above average terrain, with a transmission site and studio located at the First Victoria National Bank at 100 South Main in Victoria, by John J. & Philip J. Tibiletti in 1963. A construction permit to build the facility as specified was granted on September 28, 1964. In April 1965, modifications to the permit were applied for and granted to increase elevation to 130 meters, with an ERP increase to 3 kilowatts. The facility was constructed and a License to Cover granted to the Tibilettis, under the licensed business name Cosmopolitan Enterprises of Victoria, on August 9, 1965.

On February 27, 1968, an application was sent to the Federal Communications Commission to significantly upgrade the KTXN-FM facility. The proposal requested a change in channel operation to channel 236 (95.1 MHz), increase ERP to 40 kilowatts, and elevation to 155 meters, with the transmission site moving to the adjacent property at 120 South Main St. The proposed changes were again modified on May 13, 1969, with Cosmopolitan Enterprises requesting to instead move the channel of operation to the current 254 (98.7 MHz), at the same 40 kilowatts ERP, but decreasing elevation to 150 meters, from the proposed site at 120 South Main.

After several years of deferred action on the construction permit, a new transmission site was proposed for the facility, moving it out of town and to a new location on Farm to Market Road 1685, 2.5 miles northwest of downtown Victoria. This application downgraded the ERP of KTXN-FM to 28 kilowatts, however significantly increased height above average terrain to 285 meters horizontal & vertical. The new facilities were licensed on November 29, 1981.

References

External links
KTXN-FM official website
GAP Broadcasting - Victoria, Texas

TXN-FM
Adult hits radio stations in the United States
Jack FM stations
Victoria County, Texas
Radio stations established in 1965
1965 establishments in Texas